Vacation with a Gangster (Italian: Vacanze col gangster) is a 1951 Italian comedy film directed by Dino Risi and starring Marc Lawrence, Giovanna Pala and Terence Hill.

The film's art direction was by Flavio Mogherini.

Plot 
A man sentenced to 20 years in prison in the Monteforte prison, while working on creating toys for children, puts a note in a papier-mâché horse in which he claims to have been unjustly imprisoned and appeals to anyone who reads the message to get him out of captivity.

The horse, after alternating events, is collected in pieces in the hands of five schoolmates, Gianni, Andrea, Mario, Ugo and Nino, who find the note written by the prisoner. They then plan an escape and plan to all be promoted to go on vacation to Monteforte.

Summer arrives, and the boys anonymously send a cake to the prisoner, the convict n. 5823 with a ticket but the prisoner is in the cell together with no. 6211, a dangerous criminal, with whom he shares the cake and who, unfortunately, also finds the ticket.

By chance or by fate, even the members of the clan of prisoner 6211 are about to implement an escape plan to free their partner and take advantage of it.

The beautiful singer Amelia is also part of the criminal company, who, once they meet the boys, makes them believe that the life prisoner is her brother, so that the boys hasten the escape plan, freeing the gangster Jack Menotti.

The boys hide the fugitive in an abandoned boat, but realize too late that they have been deceived. Fortunately, the police arrive and handcuff the criminal and, some time later, will put convict no. 5823 in freedom.

Production 
Produced by Antonio Mambretti for the Mambretti Cinematographic Production, the film was shot in 1951 in Rome in the Titanus studios of the Farnesina. The film was released in theaters the following year.

The film sees the debut of Mario Girotti, then 12, then known as Terence Hill, in the role of Gianni, the orphan leader who pushes the team to the enterprise.

Cast
 Marc Lawrence as Jack Mariotti 
 Giovanna Pala as Amelia  
 Terence Hill as Gianni 
 Lamberto Maggiorani as Il galeotto innocente N. 5823  
 Gaetano Pessina as Andrea  
 Luciano Caruso as Mario  
 Alfredo Baldieri as Nino  
 Antonio Machi as Ugo  
 Silvio Bagolini as Teacher 
 Dina Perbellini 
 Anna Arena
 Bianca Doria
 Teresa Macri 
 Mario Balice
 Aldo Alimonti
 Mario Galli  
 Mario Cianfanelli

References

External links
 

1952 films
1952 comedy films
Italian comedy films
1950s Italian-language films
Films directed by Dino Risi
Films scored by Mario Nascimbene
Lux Film films
Italian black-and-white films
1950s Italian films